The Community Services Card is a credit card-sized plastic document issued to New Zealanders earning low incomes or state benefits to verify their eligibility to discounts on various community services, including healthcare, education and public transport.

External links
Community Services Card on New Zealand Ministry of Social Development website

Identity documents
Welfare in New Zealand
Social security in New Zealand